

A–V 

To find entries for A–V, use the table of contents above.

W 

 W.A.Archer – William Andrew Archer (1894–1973)
 W.A.Bell – Walter Andrew Bell (1889–1969)
 W.A.Clark – William Andrew Clark (1911–1983)
 W.A.Clarke – William Ambrose Clarke (1841–1911)
 Waddell – Coslett Herbert Waddell (1858–1919)
 Wade – Walter Wade (1760–1825)
 Wadhwa – Brij Mohan Wadhwa (1933–2009)
 Wad.Khan – M. A. Wadood Khan (fl. 1982)
 Waga – Jakub Ignacy Waga (1800–1872) 
 Wagenitz – Gerhard Wagenitz (1927–2017)
 Wagstaff – Steven J. Wagstaff (fl. 1998)
 Wahl – Herbert Alexander Wahl (1900–1975)
 Wahlenb. – Göran Wahlenberg (1780–1851)
 Waisb. – Anton Waisbecker (1835–1916)
 Waldst. – Franz de Paula Adam von Waldstein (1759–1823)
 Wall. – Nathaniel Wallich (1786–1854)
 Wallace – Alfred Russel Wallace (1823–1913)
 Wallander – Eva Wallander (fl. 2000)
 Wallays – Antoine Charles François Wallays (1812–1888)
 Wallenwein – Fritz Wallenwein (fl. 2012)
 Wallerius – Johan Gottschalk Wallerius (1709–1785)
 Walleyn – Ruben Walleyn (1966–2008)
 Wallis – Gustav Wallis (1830–1878)
 Wallman – Johan Haquin Wallman (1792–1853)
 Walln. – Anton Wallnöfer (fl. 1888)
 Wallner – Joseph Wallner (1909–1935)
 Wallossek – Christoph Wallossek (fl. 1999)
 Wallr. – Karl Friedrich Wilhelm Wallroth (1792–1857)
 Wallwork – H. Wallwork (fl. 1988)
 Walp. – Wilhelm Gerhard Walpers (1816–1853)
 Walter – Thomas Walter (1740–1789)
 Walters – Stuart Max Walters (1920–2005)
 W.Anderson – William Anderson (1750–1778)
 Wangenh. – Friedrich Adam Julius von Wangenheim (1749–1800)
 Wangerin – Walther Wangerin (1884–1938)
 Wanggai – Jack Wanggai (fl. 2000)
 Wapstra – Mark Wapstra (born 1971)
 Warb. – Otto Warburg (1859–1938)
 W.Archer – William Archer (1830–1897)
 W.Archer bis – William Archer (1820–1874)
 Ward – Lester Frank Ward (1841–1913)
 Ward.-Johnson – Greg Wardell-Johnson (fl. 1996)
 Warder – John Aston Warder (1812–1883)
 Wardle – Peter Wardle (1931–2008)
 Warion – (Jean Pierre) Adrien Warion (1837–1880)
 Warm. – Johannes Eugenius Bülow Warming (1841–1924)
 Warner – Richard Warner (c. 1711 to 1713–1775)
 Warnock – Barton Holland Warnock (1911–1998)
 Warnst. – Carl Friedrich Warnstorf (1837–1921)
 W.A.Rodrigues – William Antônio Rodrigues (born 1928)
 Warsz. – Józef Warszewicz Ritter von Rawicz (1812–1866)
 Wassh. – Dieter Carl Wasshausen (born 1938)
 Watan. – Kiyohiko Watanabe (born 1900)
 Waterh. – Benjamin Waterhouse (1754–1846)
 Watling – Roy Watling (born 1938)
 Watson – William Watson (1715–1787) (see also the abbreviation "W.Watson")
 Watt – David Allan Poe Watt (1830–1917)
 Watts – William Walter Watts (1856–1920)
 W.A.Weber – William Alfred Weber (born 1918)
 Wawra – Heinrich Wawra von Fernsee (1831–1887)
 W.Bartram – William Bartram (1739–1823)
 W.B.Carp. – William Benjamin Carpenter (1813–1885)
 W.B.Clarke – Walter Bosworth Clarke (born 1879)
 W.B.Drew – William Brooks Drew (1908–1997)
 W.Br. – William Brown (1888–1975)
 W.B.Schofield – Wilfred Borden Schofield (1927–2008)
 W.Bull – William Bull (1828–1902)
 W.C.Barton – William Charles Barton (1874–1955)
 W.C.Cheng – Wan Chun Cheng (1904–1983)
 W.C.Huang – Wei Chang Huang (fl. 2013)
 W.C.Martin – William Clarence Martin (1923–2010)
 W.Cooper – William Cooper (1798–1864)
 W.D.Clark – W. Dennis Clark (born 1948)
 W.Deane – Walter Deane (1848–1930)
 W.D.Francis – William Douglas Francis (1889–1959)
 W.D.Hawth. – William D. Hawthorne (fl. 2006)
 W.Dietr. – Werner Dietrich (1938–2011)
 W.D.J.Koch – Wilhelm Daniel Joseph Koch (1771–1849)
 Weakley – Alan Stuart Weakley (born 1957)
 Weath. – Charles Alfred Weatherby (1875–1949)
 Weatherwax – Paul Weatherwax (1888–1976)
 Webb – Philip Barker Webb (1793–1854)
 Weber – Georg Heinrich Weber (1752–1828), often written G.H. Weber
 Weberb. – Augusto Weberbauer (1871–1948)
 W.E.Cooper – Wendy Elizabeth Cooper (born 1953)
 Wedd. – Hugh Algernon Weddell (1819–1877)
 Wedem. – Wedemeyer (fl. before 1803)
 W.E.Evans – William Edgar Evans (1882–1963)
 Weeras. – Aruna Dharmapriya Weerasooriya (born 1962)
 Wege – Juliet Wege (born 1971)
 W.E.Higgins – Wesley Ervin Higgins (born 1949)
 Weibel – Raymond Weibel (1905–1992)
 Weidman – Frederick DeForest Weidman (1881–1956)
 Weigel – Christian Ehrenfried von Weigel (1748–1831)
 Weihe – Carl Ernst August Weihe (1779–1834)
 Weiller – Marc Weiller (1880–1945)
 Weim. – August Henning Weimarck (1903–1980)
 Weinm. – Johann Anton Weinmann (1782–1858)
 W.E.Lawr. – William Evans Lawrence (1883–1950)
 Wellard – Blake Wellard (fl. 2016)
 Wells – Bertram Whittier Wells (1884–1978)
 Welw. – Friedrich Welwitsch (1806–1872)
 W.E.Manning – Wayne Eyer Manning (1899–2004)
 Wendelbo – Per Erland Berg Wendelbo (1927–1981)
 Wender. – Georg Wilhelm Franz Wenderoth (1774–1861)
 Went – Friedrich August Ferdinand Christian Went (1863–1935)
 Werderm. – Erich Werdermann (1892–1959)
 Wernek. – Franz Wernekinck (1764–1839)
 Werner – Roger-Guy Werner (1901–1977)
 Wernham – Herbert Fuller Wernham (1879–1941)
 W.E.Rogers – Walter E. Rogers (1890–1951)
 Wesm. – Alfred Wesmael (1832–1905)
 Wess.Boer – Jan Gerard Wessels Boer (born 1936)
 West – William West (1848–1914)
 Westc. – Frederic Westcott (died 1861)
 Wester – Peter Jansen Wester (1877–1931)
 Westerd. – Johanna Westerdijk (1883–1961)
 Weston – Richard Weston (c. 1733–1806)
 Wetschnig – Wolfgang Wetschnig (born 1958)
 Wettst. – Richard Wettstein (1863–1931)
 Weyer – William John Bates van de Weyer (1870–1946)
 Weyland – Hermann Gerhard Weyland (1888–1974)
 W.F.Barker – Winsome Fanny ('Buddy') Barker (1907–1994)
 W.F.Hillebr. – William Francis Hillebrand (1853–1925)
 W.Fitzg. – William Vincent Fitzgerald (1867–1929)
 W.G.Lee – William George Lee (born 1950)
 W.G.Schneid. – Wilhelm Gottlieb Schneider (1814–1889)
 W.Gümbel – Wilhelm Theodor Gümbel (1812–1858)
 W.H.Adey – Walter H. Adey (born 1934)
 W.Harris – Warwick Harris (born 1940)
 W.H.Baker – William Hudson Baker (1911–1985)
 W.H.Baxter – William Hart Baxter (1816–1890)
 W.H.Brewer – William Henry Brewer (1828–1910)
 W.H.Duncan – Wilbur Howard Duncan (1910–2005)
 Wherry – Edgar Theodore Wherry (1885–1982)
 W.H.Gibson – William Hamilton Gibson (1850–1896)
 Whiffin – Trevor Paul Whiffin (born 1947)
 W.Hill – Walter Hill (1820–1904)
 Whipple – Amiel Weeks Whipple (1816–1863)
 Whistler – W. Arthur Whistler (1944–2020)
 Whitaker – Thomas Wallace Whitaker
 Whitehouse – Eula Whitehouse (1892–1974)
 Whitel. – Thomas Whitelegge (1850–1927)
 Whitlock – Barbara Ann Whitlock (born 1967)
 Whitmore – Timothy Charles Whitmore (1935–2002)
 Whittall – Edward Whittall (1851–1917)
 W.H.Lang – William Henry Lang (1874–1960)
 W.H.Lewis – Walter Hepworth Lewis (born 1930)
 W.H.Mills – William Hobson Mills (1873–1959)
 W.Hook. – William Hooker (1779–1832)
 W.H.Rao – Wen Hui Rao (fl. 2010)
W.H.Schopfer – William-Henri Schopfer (1900–1962)
 W.Hunter – William Hunter (1755–1812)
 W.H.Wagner – Warren Herbert Wagner (1920–2000)
 W.H.Welch – Winona Hazel Welch (1896–1990) 
 Wibel – August Wilhelm Eberhard Christoph Wibel (1775–1814)
 Wich. – Max Ernst Wichura (1817–1866)
 Wickens – Gerald Ernest Wickens (1927–2019) 
 Widder – Felix Joseph Widder (1892–1974)
 Wieboldt – Thomas F. Wieboldt (fl. 1992)
 Wiedem. – Ferdinand Johann Wiedemann (1805–1887)
 Wied-Neuw. – Maximilian Alexander Philipp zu Wied-Neuwied (1782–1867)
 Wiegand – Karl McKay Wiegand (1873–1942)
 Wiehe – Paul Octave Wiehe (1910–1975)
 Wieland – George Reber Wieland (1865–1953)
 Wiens –  (born 1932)
 Wiersema – John H. Wiersema (born 1950)
 Wierzb. – Piotr Pawlus (Peter (Petrus) Paulus) Wierzbicki (1794–1847)
 Wigand – Julius Wilhelm Albert Wigand (1821–1886)
 Wigg. – Friedrich Heinrich Wiggers (1746–1811)
 Wiggins – Ira Loren Wiggins (1899–1987)
 Wight – Robert Wight (1796–1872)
 Wightman – Glenn M. Wightman (born 1961)
 Wijnands – D. Onno Wijnands (1945–1993)
 Wikstr. – Johan Emanuel Wikström (1789–1856)
 Wilbr. – Johann Bernhard Wilbrand (1779–1846)
 Wilbur – Robert Lynch Wilbur (born 1925)
 Wilcock – Christopher C. Wilcock (born 1946)
 Wilczek – Ernst Wilczek (1867–1948)
 Wild – Hiram Wild (1917–1982)
 Wildpret – Wolfredo Wildpret de la Torre (born 1933)
 Wilh. – Gottlieb Tobias Wilhelm (1758–1811)
 Wilken – Dieter H. Wilken (born 1944)
 Wilkes – Charles Wilkes (1798–1877)
 Will. – William Crawford Williamson (1816–1895)
 Willd. – Carl Ludwig von Willdenow (1765–1812)
 Wille – Johan Nordal Fischer Wille (1858–1924)
 Willemet – (Pierre) Remi Willemet (1735–1807)
 Williams – Samuel Williams (1743–1817)
 Willis – John Christopher Willis (1868–1958)
 Willk. – Heinrich Moritz Willkomm (1821–1895)
 Wilmot-Dear – Christine Melanie Wilmot-Dear (born 1952)
 Wilson – William M. Wilson (1799–1871)
 Wimm. – Christian Friedrich Heinrich Wimmer (1803–1868)
 Winch – Nathaniel John Winch (1768–1838)
 Windham – Michael D. Windham (born 1954)
 Windsor – John Windsor (1787–1868)
 Wingf. – Robert C. Wingfield (born 1936)
 Winterl – Jacob Joseph Winterl (1739–1809)
 Wipff – Joseph K. Wipff (born 1962)
 Wirtg. – Philipp Wilhelm Wirtgen (1806–1870)
 Wisl. – Friedrich(Frederick) Adolph Wislizenus (1810–1889)
 Wistuba – Andreas Wistuba (born 1967)
 With. – William Withering (1741–1799)
 Witham – Henry Thomas Maire Silvertop Witham (1779–1844)
 Wittm. – Ludwig Wittmack (1839–1929)
 Wittr. – Veit Brecher Wittrock (1839–1914)
 Wittst. – Georg Christian Wittstein (1810–1887)
 W.Jacobsen – Werner Bahne Georg Jacobsen (1909–1995)
 W.Jameson – William Jameson (1815–1882)
 W.J.Baker – William John Baker (born 1972)
 W.J.de Wilde – Willem Jan Jacobus Oswald de Wilde (born 1936)
 W.J.Martin – Weston Joseph Martin (born 1917)
  W.J.McDonald – William J. McDonald (fl. 2000)
 W.J.Robbins – William Jacob Robbins (1890–1978)
 W.J.Zinger – Vasily Jakovlevich Zinger (1836–1907)
 W.K.Harris – Wayne K. Harris (fl. 1981)
 W.Kittr. – Walter Kittredge (born 1953)
 W.L.Clement – Wendy L. Clement (fl. 2009)
 W.L.Culb. – William Louis Culberson (1929–2003)
 W.L.E.Schmidt – Wilhelm Ludwig Ewald Schmidt (1804–1843)
 W.Lippert – Wolfgang Lippert (born 1937)
 W.Lodd. – W. Loddiges (fl. 1823)
 W.L.Wagner – Warren Lambert Wagner (born 1950)
 W.L.White – William Lawrence White (1908–1952)
 W.MacGill. – William MacGillivray (1796–1852)
 W.Martin – William Martin (1886–1975)
 W.Mast. – William Masters (1796–1874)
 W.M.Curtis – Winifred Mary Curtis (1905–2005)
 W.M.Lin – Wei Min Lin (fl. 2006)
 W.N.Cheesman – William Norwood Cheesman (1847–1925)
 W.N.Powell – William Nottingham Powell (born 1904)
 W.N.Takeuchi – Wayne N. Takeuchi (born 1952)
 Wodehouse – Roger Philip Wodehouse (1889–1978)
 W.O.Dietr. – Wilhelm Otto Dietrich (1881–1964)
 Wolf – Nathanael Matthaeus von Wolf (1724–1784)
 Woll. — George Buchanan Wollaston (1814–1899)
 Wolle – Francis Wolle (1817–1893)
 Wollenw. – Hans Wilhelm Wollenweber (1879–1949)
 Wolley-Dod – Anthony Hurt Wolley-Dod (1861–1948)
 W.O.Müll. – Walther Otto Müller (1833–1887)
 Wood – William Wood (1745–1808)
 Woodcock – Hubert Bayley Drysdale Woodcock (1867–1957)
 Woodrow – George Marshall Woodrow (1846–1911) 
 Woodson – Robert Everard Woodson (1904–1963)
 Woodv. – William Woodville (1752–1805)
 Woodw. – Thomas Jenkinson Woodward (1745–1820)
 Woolls – William Woolls (1814–1893)
 Woolward – Florence Helen Woolward (1854–1936)
 Wooton – Elmer Otis Wooton (1865–1945)
 Wormsk. – Morten Wormskjold (1783–1845)
 Woronow – Yury Nikolaevich Voronov (also spelt as Georg or Jurij Nikolaewitch Woronow) (1874–1931)
 Worsley – Arthington Worsley (1861–1944)
 Woyn. – Heinrich Karl Woynar (1865–1917)
 W.Palmer – William Palmer (1856–1921)
 W.P.Armstr. – Wayne Paul Armstrong (born 1941)
 W.Parry – William Edward Parry (1790–1855)
 W.P.C.Barton – William Paul Crillon Barton (1786–1856)
 W.Peck – William Dandridge Peck (1763–1822)
 W.Penn. – Winifred Ann Pennington (Tutin) (1915–2007)
 W.Petz. – Karl Wilhelm Petzold (1848–1897)
 W.P.Fang – Wen-Pei Fang (1899–1983)
 W.Phillips – William Phillips (1822–1905)
 W.P.Teschner – Walter Paul Teschner (born 1927)
 W.Q.Zhu – Wei-Qing Zhu (fl. 1999)
 Wraber – Tone Wraber (1938–2010)
 W.R.Barker – William Robert Barker (born 1948)
 W.R.B.Oliv. – Walter Reginald Brook Oliver (1883–1957)
 W.R.Buck – William Russel Buck (born 1950)
 W.Remy – Winfried Remy (1924–1995)
 W.R.Ernst – Wallace Roy Ernst (1928–1971)
 W.Rich – William Rich (1800–1864)
 Wright – John Wright (1811–1846)
 W.R.Linton – William Richardson Linton (1850–1908)
 W.R.Taylor – William Randolph Taylor (1895–1990)
 W.Saunders – William Saunders (1822–1900)
 W.Schmidt – Wilhelm Schmidt (fl. 1927)
 W.Schnizl. – Karl Friedrich Chrisoph Wilhelm Schnizlein (1780–1856)
 W.Schultze-Motel – Wolfram Schultze-Motel (1934–2011)
 W.S.Cooper – William Skinner Cooper (1884–1978)
 W.Seem. – Wilhelm Eduard Gottfried Seemann (died 1868)
 W.Siev. – Wilhelm Sievers (1860–1921)
 W.S.Stewart – William Sheldon Stewart (1914–1997)
 W.Stone – Witmer Stone (1866–1939)
 W.Suarez. – Wally Suarez (born 1977)
 W.T.Aiton – William Townsend Aiton (1766–1849)
 W.T.Davis – William Thompson Davis (1862–1945)
 W.T.Gordon – William Thomas Gordon (1884–1950)
 W.Theob. – William Theobald (1829–1908)
 W.T.Wang – Wen Tsai Wang (1926–2022) 
 Wulfen – Franz Xaver von Wulfen (1728–1805)
 Wullschl. – Heinrich Wullschlägel (1805–1864)
 Wunderlin – Richard P. Wunderlin (born 1939)
 Wurdack – John Julius Wurdack (1921–1998)
 Wurmb – Friedrich von Wurmb (died 1781)
 Württemb. – Prince Friedrich Paul Wilhelm von Württemberg (1797–1860)
 W.Watson – William Watson (1858–1925) (see also the abbreviation "Watson")
 W.Wendte – William Wendte (1877–1904)
 W.West – William West Jr (1875–1901)
 W.Wettst. – Wolfgang Wettstein (born 1898)
 W.Wight – William Franklin Wight (1874–1954)
 W.Wolf – Wolfgang Wolf (1875–1950)
 W.W.Payne – Willard William Payne (born 1937)
 W.Wright – William Wright (1735–1819)
 W.W.Sm. – William Wright Smith (1875–1956)
 Wyatt-Sm. – John Wyatt-Smith (1917–2002)
 Wydler – Heinrich Wydler (1800–1883)
 W.Y.Hsia – Wei Ying Hsia (1896–1987)
 W.Zimm. – Walter Max Zimmerman (1892–1980)

X 

 X.D.Liu – Liu Xiaodong (fl. 1976)
 X.F.Gao – Xin Fen Gao (born 1965)
 X.H.Jin – Xiao Hua Jin (born 1975)
 Xin Y.Chen – Xin Yan Chen (fl. 2019)
 X.J.Ge – Xue Jun Ge (fl. 2001)
 X.J.Xue – Xiang Ji Xue (collected in 1983)
 X.Q.Song – Xi Qiang Song (fl. 2008)
 X.Y.Huang – Xin Yi Huang (fl. 2015)

Y 

 Yakovlev – Gennady Pavlovic Yakovlev (born 1934)
 Yamam. – Yoshimatsu Yamamoto (1893–1947)
 Yan Liu – Yan Liu (fl. 2003)
 Yasuda – Atsushi Yasuda (1868–1924)
 Yatabe – Ryôkichi Yatabe (1851–1899)
 Yates – Lorenzo Gordin Yates (1837–1909)
 Y.Baba – Yumiko Baba (fl. 2012)
 Y.B.Luo – Yi Bo Luo (born 1964)
 Y.C.F.Su – Yvonne Chuan Fang Su
 Y.C.Wu – Yin Chan Wu (1901–1950)
 Y.C.Yang – Yung Chang Yang (born 1927)
 Yen C.Yang – Yen Chin Yang (1913–1984)
 Yeo – Peter Frederick Yeo (1929–2010)
 Y.F.Deng – Yun Fei Deng (fl. 2001)
 Y.H.Tan – Yun Hong Tan (fl. 2012)
 Yii – P.C. Yii (fl. 2001)
 Ying Qin – Ying Qin (fl. 2018)
 Y.Itô – Yoshi Itô (1907–1992)
 Y.Kimura – Yojiro Kimura (1912–2006)
 Y.L.Chen – Yi Ling Chen (born 1930)
 Y.M.Ye – Ye Yinmin (fl. 1976)
 Y.N.Lee – Yong No Lee (1920–2008)
 Yohannan – Regy Yohannan (fl. 2012)
 Yokota – Masatsugu Yokota Born 1955)
 Yo.Tanaka – Yoshio Tanaka (1838–1916)
 Y.P.Ng – Yan Peng Ng
 Ysabeau – Alexandre Victor Frédéric Ysabeau (1793–1873)
 Y.Sasaki – Yoshiyuki Sasaki (1926–1972)
 Y.Sawa – Yutaka Sawa (fl. 2006)
 Y.S.Chen – You Sheng Chen (fl. 2003)
 Y.Schouten – Y. Schouten (fl. 1985)
 Y.S.Kim – Yun Shik Kim (born 1934)
 Y.S.Wang – Yu Sheng Wang (fl. 1985)
 Y.T.Chang – Yong Tian Chang (born 1936)
 Yu Ito – Yu Ito (born 1981)
 Yunck. – Truman George Yuncker (1891–1964)
 Yu.Tanaka – Yuichiro Tanaka (1901–1983)
 Y.W.Low – Yee Wen Low (born 1981)
 Y.W.Zhang – Yu Wu Zhang (fl. 2001)
 Y.Y.Fang – Yun Yi Fang (born 1916)

Z 

 Zabel – Hermann Zabel (1832–1912)
 Zahlbr. – Alexander Zahlbruckner (1860–1938)
 Zahn – Karl Hermann Zahn (1865–1940)
 Zämelis – Aleksander Zämelis (1897–1943)
 Zanardini – Giovanni Antonio Maria Zanardini (1804–1878)
 Zanoni – Thomas A. Zanoni (born 1949)
 Zanted. – Giovanni Zantedeschi (1773–1846)
 Zapał. – Hugo Zapałowicz (1852–1917)
 Zappi – Daniela Cristina Zappi (born 1965)
 Zardini – Elsa Matilde Zardini (born 1949)
 Zarrei – Mehdi Zarrei (born 1979)
 Zaw. – Aleksander Zawadzki (1798–1868)
 Zaytzeva – Ekaterina S. Zaytzeva (fl. 1999)
 Z.Collins – Zacchaeus Collins (1764–1831)
 Zea – Francisco Antonio Zea (1770–1822)
 Zeile – Elsie May Zeile (1870–1940)
 Zeiller – Charles René Zeiller (1847–1915)
 Zelený – Václav Zelený (1936–2020) 
 Zenari – Silvia Zenari (1896–1956)
 Zenker – Jonathan Carl Zenker (1799–1837)
 Zenkert – Charles Anthony Zenkert (1886–1972)
 Zepern. – Bernhard Zepernick (1926–2019)
 Zerova – Marija Ja. (Mariya Ya.) Zerova (1902–1994)
 Zeyh. – Karl Ludwig Philipp Zeyher (1799–1858)
 Zhao – Yu Tang Zhao (1932–2010) 
 Zhebrak – Anton Romanovich Zhebrak (1901–1965)
 Z.H.Pan – Ze Hui Pan (born 1938)
 Z.H.Tsi – Zhan Huo Tsi (1937–2001)
 Zhuk. – Peter Mikhailovich Zhukovsky (1888–1975)
 Z.H.Yang – Zen Hong Yang (fl. 1988)
 Zich – Frank Zich (born 1968)
 Ziel. – Jerzy Zieliński (born 1943)
 Zijp – Coenraad van Zijp (born 1879)
 Zimm. – Philipp Wilhelm Albrecht Zimmermann (1860–1931)
 Zimmerm. – Walter Max Zimmerman
 Zinn – Johann Gottfried Zinn (1727–1759)
 Zipp. – Alexander Zippelius (1797–1828)
 Z.Iwats. – Zennoske Iwatsuki (born 1929)
 Ziz – Johann Baptist Ziz (1779–1829)
 Zizka – Georg Zizka (born 1955)
 Z.J.Liu – Zhong Jian Liu (born 1958)
 Z.L.Chen – Zong Lian Chen (fl. 1985)
 Zohary – Michael Zohary (1898–1983)
 Zoll. – Heinrich Zollinger (1818–1859)
 Zona – Scott Zona (born 1959)
 Zonn. – Ben Zonneveld (born 1940)
 Zopf – Friedrich (or Friederich) Wilhelm Zopf (1846–1909)
 Zorn – Johannes Zorn (1739–1799)
 Z.Plobsh. – Friedrich August Zorn von Plobsheim (1711–1789)
 Z.P.Wang – Zheng Ping Wang (born 1929)
 Z.S.Rogers – Zachary Scott Rogers (born 1976)
 Zucc. – Joseph Gerhard Zuccarini (1790–1848)
 Zuccagni – Attilio Zuccagni (1754–1807)
 Zuloaga – Fernando Omar Zuloaga (born 1951)
 Zwanziger – Gustav Adolf Zwanziger (1837–1893)
 Zycha – Herbert Zycha (1903–1998)
 Z.Y.Zhu – Zheng Yin Zhu (born 1944)

 
1